Mun Myeong-sik (born 20 May 1972) is a South Korean wrestler. He competed in the men's freestyle 54 kg at the 2000 Summer Olympics.

References

External links

1972 births
Living people
South Korean male sport wrestlers
Olympic wrestlers of South Korea
Wrestlers at the 2000 Summer Olympics
Place of birth missing (living people)
Asian Games medalists in wrestling
Wrestlers at the 1994 Asian Games
Medalists at the 1994 Asian Games
Asian Games bronze medalists for South Korea
20th-century South Korean people
21st-century South Korean people